NH 150 may refer to:

 National Highway 150 (India)
 New Hampshire Route 150, United States